Montenegro Shipping Lines, Inc. (MSLI) is a Philippine domestic shipping line based at the Batangas International Port in Batangas City, Philippines. It operates passenger, cargo and RORO vessels to various destinations in the Philippines under the brands Montenegro Lines and Marina Ferries.

History
Montenegro Shipping Lines was established on 16 September 1978 by entrepreneur Vicente Leyco Montenegro, Sr., a pioneer in commercial and public transportation in the Philippines. The first route was that the company served was from Batangas City to Abra de Ilog, Occidental Mindoro using the boat MV Malaya. Over the past 40 years, MSLI provided passenger and commercial marine transportation services (cargo or vehicles) with a fleet of fast ferries and RORO vessels to 13 ports in the Philippines. In 2010, the company acquired eight additional RORO vessels worth PH₱1 billion from the Development Bank of the Philippines' Maritime Leasing Corporation and other lenders. By 2012, the company operated over 30 vessels on its fleet of passenger, cargo, and RORO vessels throughout Luzon and Visayas. As of 2020, the company has 59 vessels calling on 34 ports across the Philippines. Moreover, the company has a controlling stake over RORO Bus Transport Services Inc., a Philippine bus company that transports passengers to different destinations in the Philippines via the Strong Republic Nautical Highway.

In 2019, MSLI became a member of the Philippine Coastwise Shipping Association (PCSA), the biggest shipping group in the Philippines.

Destinations
As of 2020, Montenegro Shipping Lines served the following destinations:

Vessels
Montenegro Lines operates the following vessels:

Tugboats

MT Montenegro Tugboat

Roll-on Roll-off Vessels

MV Maria Angela
MV Maria Beatriz
MV Maria Diana
MV Maria Erlinda
MV Maria Felisa
MV Maria Gloria
MV Maria Helena
MV Maria Isabel
MV Maria Josefa
MV Marie Kristina
MV Maria Lolita
MV Maria Matilde
MV Maria Natasha
MV Maria Oliva
MV Maria Querubin
MV Maria Rebecca
MV Maria Sophia
MV Marie Teresa
MV Maria Ursula
M/V Maria Vanessa
MV Maria Wynona
MV Maria Xenia
MV Maria Yasmina
MV Maria Zenaida
MV Reina Emperatriz
MV Santa Brigida
MV Santa Carmelita
MV Santa Editha 
MV Santa Soledad
MV Reina del Rosario

Fast-crafts

FC City of Angeles
FC City of Batangas
FC City of Bacolod
FC City of Cebu
FC City of Calapan
FC City of Dapitan
FC City of Lucena
FC City of Masbate
FC City of Pio Duran
FC City of Polambato
FC City of Sorsogon
FC City of Tabaco
FC Province of Romblon
FC City of Zamboanga

Marina Ferries

MV Reina delos Angeles
LCT Reina Banderada
MV Reina Divina Gracia
MV Reina Del Cielo
MV Reina delas Flores
M/V Reina Genoveva
LCT Reina Justisya
MV Reina Hosanna
MV Reina Immaculada
MV Reina Kleopatra
MV Reina de Luna
MV Reina Magdalena
MV Reina Neptuna
MV Reina Olympia
MV Reina Quelita
MV Reina Sentenciada
MV Reina Timotea
MV Reina Urduja
MV Reina Veronica
MV Reina Wilhelmina
MV Reina Xaviera
MV Reina Yvonne

Incidents and accidents
 On 11 April 2002, a fire broke out on the cargo hold of MV Maria Carmela as it sailed from Masbate City to Lucena, causing it to sink. The incident, which happened of the coast of Pagbilao, Quezon, killed 39 people, while 371 individuals survived.
 On 17 March 2017, 88 passengers and 26 crew members onboard MV Reina Hossana were rescued by the Philippine Coast Guard after a fire broke out onboard. The vessel was traveling from Calapan to Batangas City when the incident happened. The fire was eventually put out and the vessel was towed to Batangas City. Another MSLI vessel, MV Reina Divinagracia, which was sent from Calapan to help rescue the passengers and crew of MV Reina Hossana, ran aground in the vicinity of Balahibong Manok Island in Tingloy, Batangas. All of its 104 passengers and 20 crew were rescued, while the vessel was freed from its location and towed to port.
 On 1 April 2017, MV Maria Oliva suffered loss of power to its engines while en route from San Ricardo, Southern Leyte to Surigao City, Surigao del Norte. The vessel floated without power for 10 hours until a Philippine Coast Guard vessel arrived and rescued the 264 individuals onboard. Another civilian vessel arrived and towed the vessel to Lipata Port in Surigao City.
 On 26 September 2017, 87 people were injured when MV Matilde rammed into a rock formation in the vicinity of Calatrava, Romblon due to a steering problem. The vessel was traveling from Odiongan to Romblon, Romblon when the incident happened. The vessel safely reached its destination but sustained severe damage to its bow.

See also

List of shipping companies in the Philippines
SuperFerry
Negros Navigation
Cebu Ferries
Supercat
Roble Shipping Inc.

References

1978 establishments in the Philippines
Ferry companies of the Philippines
Shipping companies of the Philippines
Companies based in Batangas City